This is a list of rivers in Gabon. This list is arranged by drainage basin, with respective tributaries indented under each larger stream's name.

Atlantic Ocean

Campo River (Ntem River)
Kyé River
Nyé River
Benito River (Mbini River) (Woleu River)
Utamboni River
Noya River
Komo River
Mbeya River
Ogooué River
Ngounie River
Ikoy River
Ikobe River
Oumba River
Ovigui River
Dollé River
Ogoulou River
Louetsié River
Ngongo River
Mbine River
Abanga River
Nkan River
Okano River
Lara River
Ngolo River
Offoue River
Nke River
Ivindo River
Mvung River
Kuye River
Mounianghi River
Libumba River
Lodié River
Oua River
Djadie River
Djoua River
Aïna River
Dilo River
Lolo River
Wagny River
Lebiyou River
Bouenguidi River
Lassio River
Sebe River
Loula River
Lebiri River
Leyou River
Lekoni River
Lekey River
Lekabi River
Lekedi River
Lebombi River
Mpassa River
Baniaka River
Letili River
Nkomi River
Nyanga River
Moukalaba River
Ganzi River
Douli River
Douigni River

References

Army Map Service 1958
 GEOnet Names Server

Gabon
Rivers